Al Hafirah is a small desert village in Ha'il Province, in northern-central Saudi Arabia.

References

Populated places in Ha'il Province